Minturn, South Carolina (also called Mineral Springs) is an unincorporated community in Dillon County, South Carolina, United States.

The CSX railway Andrews Subdivision passes through Minturn.

The Minturn Cotton Company operates a gin in the settlement, where it processes cotton harvested from nearby fields.  The Minturn Church is also located in the settlement.

Notable person
Preston Lang Bethea - member of the South Carolina House of Representatives during 1911 and 1912.
Kenneth Manning - author and professor at M.I.T. 1974 - present

References

Unincorporated communities in Dillon County, South Carolina
Unincorporated communities in South Carolina